Brian Lee Crowley (born 1955) is a Canadian political economist, author, and public policy commentator. Since 2010 he has been managing director of the Macdonald-Laurier Institute, a think tank in Ottawa, Ontario, Canada. From 1995 until about 2009 he was president of the Atlantic Institute for Market Studies in Halifax, Nova Scotia.

Books 
 The Self, the Individual and the Community. Oxford University Press, 1987
 The Road to Equity: Impolitic Essays. Stoddart, 1994
 Taking Ownership: Property Rights and Fishery Management on the Atlantic Coast, editor. Atlantic Institute for Market Studies, 1996.
 Fearful Symmetry: The Fall and Rise of Canada's Founding Values. Key Porter Books, 2009.
 The Canadian Century: Moving Out of America's Shadow, with Jason Clemens and Neils Veldhuis. Key Porter Books, 2010.
 Gardeners vs. Designers: Understanding the Great Fault Line in Canadian Politics. Sutherland House, 2020.

References 

Living people
Writers from Vancouver
Canadian activists
Canadian economists
Canadian non-fiction writers
1955 births